Crescent Lake is a lake in northeastern Cache County, Utah, United States.

Description
The lake is located in the Bear River Range within the Uinta-Wasatch-Cache National Forest at an elevation of 

Crescent Lake was so named on account of its outline being shaped like a crescent.

See also

 List of lakes in Utah

References

Lakes of Utah
Lakes of Cache County, Utah